McKennan is a surname of Irish origin. It may refer to:

 John T. McKennan (1918–2011), New York politician
 Peter McKennan (1918–1991), Scottish footballer
 Thomas McKean Thompson McKennan (1794–1852), US congressman from Pennsylvania, US Secretary of the Interior
 William McKennan (1816–1893), United States federal judge

See also
 McKenna (name)